Hasle is a village in the municipality of Sarpsborg, Norway, located on the eastern bank of Glomma. Its population is 698. Before 1992 Hasle was a part of Varteig municipality.

References

Villages in Østfold
Sarpsborg
Populated places on the Glomma River